Paris Georgakopoulos (born 23 June 1965) is a Greek former international footballer who played professionally as a midfielder.

Career

Club career
Georgakopoulos began his career with Panachaiki GE in 1982, before moving to Panathinaikos in 1986. Georgakopoulos represented Panathinaikos in the 1989 Greek Super Cup. He also played in the Greek Cup finals of 1989, and 1991.

Georgakopoulos effectively retired from football in 1992 after an argument with Yiorgos Vardinogiannis about his contract renewal, and he take up a career in civil engineering, although he was still contracted to Panathinaikos until 1995.

League statistics

International career
Georgakopoulos earned two caps for the Greek national side in 1989.

References

1965 births
Living people
Greek footballers
People from Kyparissia
Greece international footballers
Panathinaikos F.C. players
Association football midfielders
Footballers from the Peloponnese